Witham Health Services is a county-owned hospital located in Lebanon, Indiana. The hospital was established in 1915 with a grant from Flavius J. Witham and family. The hospital opened in 1917. In 2003, Witham opened a  replacement hospital.

References

External links
 Official Website

Hospital buildings completed in 1917
Hospitals in Indiana
Hospitals established in 1915